Ussara ancyristis is a species of sedge moth in the genus Ussara. It was described by Edward Meyrick in 1920. It is found in Brazil.

References

Moths described in 1920
Glyphipterigidae